Town Center at Cobb (often called Town Center Mall), is a super-regional shopping mall located in Cobb County, Georgia near Atlanta. The anchor stores are two Macy's stores, a Belk, and a JCPenney. There is one vacant anchor stores that was once Sears.

History
Opened in late February 1986, the mall was originally anchored by Rich's, Macy's and Sears. The Mall was almost identical to Gwinnett Place Mall. The Macy's store was the first in Atlanta not to have originally been part of the Atlanta-based Davison's chain, which became Macy's during its opening. The largest mall in the state when it opened, a fourth anchor, Mervyn's, joined the mall later in 1986, along with another at Gwinnett Place Mall.

Town Center is part of a major retail hub in northern Cobb County, Georgia along Barrett Parkway. It was located between parallel parts of I-75 and I-575, just north of where the interstates meet or split from each other. The mall itself has seen several significant changes over the years. In 1992, a new wing extending north from the east wing was finally added with Atlanta's first Birmigham, Alabama-based Parisian department store. This was also likewise done at Phipps Plaza also in 1992, Gwinnett Place Mall in 1993, and Northlake Mall in 1994. This brought the store count at the mall up to 220 stores and the amount of anchor store up to five. No other mall in both the area and state had five anchors at the time except for North Point Mall, which opened also in 1993.

Enormously successful and drawing away customers that originally shopped at older Cumberland and Cobb Center Malls, the mall was first renovated in 1995 but has never been expanded aside from the Parisian addition. Store consolidations and retractions, however, have varied the anchor line-up in recent years. First, in 1997, JCPenney took over the former location of Mervyn's, which pulled out of Georgia and Florida at the time. Second, Rich's and Macy's were merged into one store, prompting the closure of the three-story Macy's that had been there since the mall's original opening. However, part of the store was refurbished and was used as a Macy's Furniture Gallery (originally a Rich's-Macy's Furniture Gallery) and now operates as Macy's Furniture Gallery, Macy's Furniture Clearance Center and Macy's Men's Store. Macy's now occupies the former Rich's location.

Occupancy rates remain very high at the mall, and most major chain specialty stores are found in the mall. However, the mall was facing competition from all the big box stores on Barrett Parkway, two "lifestyle centers" that opened up on each end of the county and more upscale malls such as Phipps Plaza and Lenox Square. However, on May 13, 2008, the mall announced a year-long renovation project and also added H&M.  The project was finished in May 2009 with new food court designs, family restrooms, children's play area, signage, and soft seating areas. On February 7, 2017, Macy's announced that Macy's Backstage will be opening inside Macy's in Spring 2017. On May 29, 2020, it was announced that Sears would be closing as part of a plan to close 28 stores nationwide. The store closed on August 9, 2020.

Deutsche Bank was the lead lender and trustee for a $200 million loan granted the mall in 2012. On February 2, 2021, the mall was put up for public auction on the Cobb County courthouse steps with an opening bid of $130,400,000. There were no offers tendered and the mall was foreclosed on. The mall continues to operate with new management.

Anchors

Current anchors
Belk (2007–present)
JCPenney (1997–present)
Macy's (2 locations) (2005–present)

Former anchors
Macy's (original location) (1986-2003)
Mervyn's (1986-1997)
Parisian (1992-2007)
Rich's (1986-2005)
Sears (1986-2020)

References

https://www.tonetoatl.com/

External links
 Town Center Community Improvement District.

Buildings and structures in Cobb County, Georgia
Shopping malls in the Atlanta metropolitan area
Shopping malls established in 1986
Tourist attractions in Cobb County, Georgia